Alan Newton may refer to:
 Alan Newton (cricketer) (1894–1979), Australian cricketer
 Alan Newton (cyclist) (born 1931), British cyclist
 Sir Alan Newton (surgeon) (1887–1949), Australian surgeon